is a Japanese label of Omega Vision Inc. a publisher of bishōjo and eroge visual novel games. Its name is a reference to the navel orange.

History
Navel was formed by former staff of BasiL such as Aoi Nishimata, Ō Jackson, and Acchorike and made a hit with 2002 visual novel "Sore wa Maichiru Sakura no Youni" before they left in 2003 and formed Navel under company Omegavision, inc. which later Hiro Suzuhira joined. An official website was established as they promoted their first game "Shuffle!".

On January 30, 2006, their first game was released apparently made a big hit and ranked 3 at Getchu.com's sales ranking, which was the born of the spin-offs.

As of February 23, 2007, Hiro Suzuhira left Navel due to her poor health, with "Ne~ pon? Raipon!" as her last game with the company, and becomes a freelancer.

On March 25, 2009, Navel established their sister brand Lime which was announced in magazine PUSH!! issue May 2006, with their first game "Nostradamus ni Kiite Miro".

On April 21, 2012, Navel's sister brand Lime established their child brand Lime Vert with concept "pure love that weighted on adult scenes". Their first game was ××× na Kanojo ga Inaka Seikatsu wo Mankitsu Suru Himitsu no Hōhō.

On October 26, 2012 Navel announced their 10th anniversary game "Tsuki ni Yorisō Otome no Sahō" with Hiro Suzuhira back as one of character designer. The game is planned to be a trilogy.

On November 30, 2013, they celebrated the 10th anniversary of their first game, "Shuffle!" along with establishments of their new child brand Navel HoneyBell and its first game "Sora Tobu Hitsuji to Manatsu no Hana".

Works

Visual Novels

By Navel
Shuffle! (January 30, 2004)
Soul Link (December 17, 2004)
Tick! Tack! (September 16, 2005)
Really? Really! (November 24, 2006)
Oretachi ni Tsubasa wa Nai ~Prelude~ (June 28, 2008)
Oretachi ni Tsubasa wa Nai (January 30, 2009)
Shuffle! Essence+ (October 30, 2009)
Soul Link Ultimate (June 25, 2010)
Oretachi ni Tsubasa wa Nai ~After Story~ (July 30, 2010)
Sekai Seifuku Kanojo (December 24, 2010)
Shuffle! Love Rainbow (April 28, 2011)
World Wide Love! Sekai Seifuku Kanojo Fan Disc (October 28, 2011)
Tsuki ni Yorisō Otome no Sahō (October 26, 2012)
Otome Riron to Sono Shuuhen -Ecole de Paris- (July 26, 2013)
Tsuki ni Yorisō Otome no Sahō 2 (December 19, 2014)
Otome Riron to Sono go no Shuuhen -Belle Époque- (May 27, 2016)
Kimi to Mezameru Ikutsuka no Houhou (March 26, 2018)
Spiral!! (February 15, 2019)
Princess x Princess (August 3, 2021)

Collaboration between Navel and LimeNee Pon? × Rai Pon! (August 31, 2007)

By Navel HoneybellSora Tobu Hitsuji to Manatsu no Hana: When Girls Wish Upon A Star. (April 25, 2014)Magical ☆ Dears (November 27, 2015)

By Lime & Lime VertNostradamus ni Kiite Miro (January 25, 2008)Maximum Magic (March 26, 2010)Peta Peta (April 30, 2010)Love☆Kiss (August 26, 2011)××× na Kanojo ga Inaka Seikatsu wo Mankitsu Suru Himitsu no Hōhō (June 29, 2012)Royal Duty/Flush (February 22, 2013)

OthersMarriage RoyaleJudgement Chime''

References

External links
Navel official website 
Lime official website 
Navel at The Visual Novel Database 

Amusement companies of Japan
Hentai companies
Video game companies of Japan
Video game companies established in 2003
Japanese companies established in 2003